Shiashkotan; (Shasukotan-tō) is an uninhabited volcanic island near the center of the Kuril Islands chain in the Sea of Okhotsk in the northwest Pacific Ocean, separated from Ekarma by the Ekarma Strait. Its name is derived from the Ainu language, from “Konbu village”.

Geology
Shiashkotan is roughly dumbbell-shaped, formed by two volcanic islands joined together by a narrow landspit. Both ends of the island are complex stratovolcanos, and landing is possible only on the sandy isthmus.
Historical eruptions have occurred at Sinarka during 1825–1750, 1846, 1855, and the last and largest from 1872 to 1878. To the east from this volcano is located interesting geothermal field - North-Western solfatara field with more than 100 fumaroles and several hot, geyser-like springs which erupt water up to 1.5 m high.
  Pik Kuntomintar -(Kitaiō-dake), occupies the southern end of the island. A central cone fills a 4-4.5 kilometer diameter caldera, and there is a second caldera on the west side which is breached to the west. The only known postglacial activity of Kuntomintar is continuous fulmarole activity near the east wall of the inner caldera and a nearby hot sulfur spring.

History
Shiashkotan was inhabited by the Ainu, who subsided off of hunting and fishing at the time of European contact. The island appears on an official map showing the territories of Matsumae Domain, a feudal domain of Edo period Japan dated 1644, and these holdings were officially confirmed by the Tokugawa shogunate in 1715. Subsequently, claimed by the Empire of Russia, sovereignty initially passed to Russia under the terms of the Treaty of Shimoda. During an eruption of 1872, Russian authorities recorded that 13 inhabitants died; however, when the island was returned to the Empire of Japan per the Treaty of Saint Petersburg (1875) along with the rest of the Kuril islands, no inhabitants remained as they had chosen to move north to Kamchatka, which remained under the Russian jurisdiction. The island was formerly administered as part of Shimushu District of Nemuro Subprefecture of Hokkaidō. In 1893, a settlement was attempted by nine members of the Chishima Protective Society led by Gunji Shigetada; however, when a ship called on the island a year later, five of the colonists had already died, and the remaining four were critically ill with beri-beri.
After World War II, the island came under the control of the Soviet Union, and is now administered as part of the Sakhalin Oblast of the Russian Federation.

See also
 List of volcanoes in Russia
 List of islands of Russia

Notes

References

Further reading
 Gorshkov, G. S. Volcanism and the Upper Mantle Investigations in the Kurile Island Arc. Monographs in geoscience. New York: Plenum Press, 1970. 
 Krasheninnikov, Stepan Petrovich, and James Greive. The History of Kamtschatka and the Kurilski Islands, with the Countries Adjacent. Chicago: Quadrangle Books, 1963.
 Rees, David. The Soviet Seizure of the Kuriles. New York: Praeger, 1985. 
 Takahashi, Hideki, and Masahiro Ōhara. Biodiversity and Biogeography of the Kuril Islands and Sakhalin. Bulletin of the Hokkaido University Museum, no. 2-. Sapporo, Japan: Hokkaido University Museum, 2004.

External links

 
Active volcanoes
Islands of the Sea of Okhotsk
Islands of the Russian Far East
Stratovolcanoes of Russia
Islands of the Kuril Islands
Uninhabited islands of Russia
Calderas of Russia
Volcanoes of the Kuril Islands
Mountains of the Kuril Islands